Blue Bells Model School is a co-educational English medium school affiliated to CBSE Board, located in the city of Gurgaon, Haryana, India. Founded in the year in 1980 the School was affiliated to CBSE in 1986 till class X. Later, in 1991, the school was further upgraded to enroll students in class XII. The apex body of the school is D.R. Memorial Bal Shiksha Vikas Society.

House system
The school is divided into four houses:
Indira Gandhi (green)
Mother Teresa (blue)
Nehru (red)
Tagore (yellow)

Each house is under the charge of a House Mister/Mistress along with House Captains and Prefects. Inter-House competitions are organized.

Location and area
The school is located in sector 4, Gurugram. It is an area of 5 acres. Daily New Activities Are Planned On the Basis of specified curriculum & CCE pattern practices.

Events and activities 

 Academic Carnival Unwrapping Learning Packages

 Empezar’ – A Beginning, Health and Wellness Festival 2019

 Kargil Vijay Diwas by NCC

Awards and recognition 

 Topped Gurugram for Class X results in 2019

 Topped Humanities in 2017 for Class XII

 Winner of Banner Contest at HT-PACE’s Inquizitive 2017

Notable alumni
 Rajkumar Rao

References

External links 

Private schools in Haryana
Primary schools in India
High schools and secondary schools in Haryana
Schools in Gurgaon
Educational institutions established in 1980
1980 establishments in Haryana